Françoise Fillioux (or Filloux, 2 September 1865 – 22 October 1925), known as "La Mère Fillioux" or "La Mère Filloux", was a French chef, proprietor of a famous restaurant in Lyon. Among her successors was Eugénie Brazier who worked in her kitchen as a young woman and continued her traditions of Lyonnaise cookery.

Life and career
Françoise was born Benoîte Fayolle, on 2 September 1865 in the commune of Auzelles, in the Auvergne, into a large family. She went to work, first in Grenoble and then in Lyon, in bourgeois houses, including that of Gaston Eymard, a director of an insurance company and a dedicated gastronome. There, over the following ten years, she learned to cook to a high standard.

She married Louis Fillioux, whose father owned a building in the centre of Lyon. The couple opened a bistro there. From modest beginnings it became nationally, and to some extent internationally, famous. In a tribute published after her death, La Tribune asked rhetorically, "Who is the traveller, who is the tourist, who did not know La Mère Filloux in Lyon?"

The menu varied more than the paper suggests – it included hors d'oeuvre of ham, sausage and galantine, quenelles au gratin with crayfish butter, and game in season – but was short and predictable. Some local people were reported as saying, "We only go there rarely, because however exquisite the food is, one cannot eat the same thing over and over again".

Fillioux became famous for her main course: "volaille truffée demi-deuil" (truffled chicken in half-mourning). The dish consisted of a Bresse chicken poached in chicken stock, with slices of black truffle inserted under the skin. (When it was cooked, the truffle showed through the white skin of the chicken so that the overall appearance was black-and-white; hence the name.) Fillioux would carve the chickens at the table, using only an ordinary table knife, a piece of culinary showmanship later practised by Eugénie Brazier, who trained under her.

After the chicken came the artichoke hearts with melted butter, on a large truffle base. The meal would conclude with pâtisserie, cheese or fruit.

In 1924, a year before Fillioux's death, the influential food writer Curnonsky, France's "Prince of Gastronomy", wrote, "She is as famous as Marechal Foch, Anatole France, Kipling, Chaplin, and Mistinguett. She is a great star and also a lovable Frenchwoman, one of the greatest Cordons Bleus on earth".

Fillioux died on 22 October 1925 at the age of 60. Her restaurant continued after her death, but her mantle was generally held to have been inherited by Brazier, who featured several of Fillioux's best-known dishes on her menus, most conspicuously the chicken "demi-deuil".

Notes, references and sources

Notes

References

Sources
 
 Introduction by Drew Smith.
 
 
 
 
 
         
 
 

1865 births
1925 deaths
Chefs from Lyon
Chefs of French cuisine
French chefs
French restaurateurs
Women chefs
Women restaurateurs